QFS (Quick File System) is an open source filesystem from Oracle. 

QFS may also refer to:

 Quantcast File System, an open-source distributed file system software package for large-scale MapReduce/batch-processing workloads
 Quick-Shift Focus System on the Pentax D FA* 70-200mm lens
 QFS Aviation, a YouTube channel uploading trip reports onboard airlines

See also
QF (disambiguation)